Kevada Mosque (also Kewda or Kevda) is a mosque in Champaner, Gujarat state, western India. It is part of the Champaner-Pavagadh Archaeological Park, a UNESCO World Heritage Site. The mosque has minarets, globe-like domes, and narrow stairs. According to Ruggles (2008), nature was integrated into the Kevada mosque's architecture in a way that was unusual elsewhere in the Islamic world.

This mosque was built in Champaner during the time of Mahmud Begada, as were several other mosques, such as the Bawaman, Ek Minar, Jama, Khajuri, Nagina, and Shahar Ki. After James Burgess and Henry Cousens wrote descriptions of the Kevada, Jama, and Nagina Mosques, roads were built to reach them. The Kevada is notable because of its mausoleum. Kathra Mosque is west of the Kevada.

The mosque has many mihrabs, all intricately carved. There is a damaged brick tank for ablutions before prayers are offered at the mosque. The centotaph is square in shape with a fluted central dome and four corner domes; it is located next to the tank. The layout of the mosque is rectangular. Floral and geometrical designs adorn the niches. The tribate inter-columns are considered attractive. The prayer hall, a double storied structure, had three domes but the central dome has since disappeared. The windows have balconies built over pillars with intricate carved decorations. There are two minarets, which are also decorated with intricate carvings. Restoration works were carried out in the 1890s.

Archaeological Survey of India (ASI) reports of 2006 indicate that extensive restoration works were carried out at the Kevada Mosque and also at many other monuments in Champaner-Pavagadh Archaeological Park, the Jami Mosque, fort walls, Bawana Mosque, Lila Gubaz, Sikandar Shah Tomb and Sikander tomb, which resulted in a slight increase in tourist traffic to the sites. ASI had already spent Rs 2.25 crores (about US$0.45 million) on conservation in a four-year period and a further Rs 1.15 crores (US$0.23 million) was allotted for more restoration work at the sites.

See also
 List of Monuments of National Importance in Gujarat
 Monuments of Champaner-Pavagadh Archaeological Park

References

Mosques in Champaner
Champaner-Pavagadh Archaeological Park
15th-century mosques